The Whittle Laboratory has its origins in Sir Frank Whittle and a number of his original team, from Cambridge, and who in 1937 invented the jet engine. In opening the Laboratory in 1973 the aim was to develop the technology which would underpin the emerging age of mass air travel. The Whittle Laboratory today is one of the world's leading jet engine and power generation research laboratories. It has partnered with Rolls-Royce, Mitsubishi Heavy Industries, and Siemens for over 50 years; with Dyson for 8 years; and in the last few years with many of the new entrants into the aviation sector. The Whittle Laboratory has successfully translated hundreds of primary research ideas into industrial products and its research has been awarded the American Society of Mechanical Engineers highest honour, the ‘Gas Turbine Award’ 15 times. The current focus of the Laboratory is to accelerate the decarbonisation of flight.

Origin
The Whittle Laboratory was initially set-up with a grant from the Science Research Council by Sir  John Horlock who was to become the first director of the lab, and Sir William Hawthorne who was the head of the Cambridge University Engineering Department and who had developed the combustion chamber in Sir Frank Whittle jet engine used in the first British jet aircraft.

The Development of Computational Methods
Professor John Denton  was one of the first to develop numerical methods for flow calculation in turbomachines using time-marching methods. He was soon joined by Prof Bill Dawes and together the numerical methods that he has developed became widely used around the world receiving many international awards for his work. The advent of CFD was groundbreaking not only because for the first time researchers and designers could calculate the correct loss mechanisms within turbomachines (rather than relying on empirical correlations), but also because the numerical methods could also be used as design tools to improve component efficiencies.

Industry Partnerships
Since its origin the Whittle Laboratory primary aim has been to build a bridge across ‘the Valley of Death’ – the place where brilliant primary research is not translated into product. The research partnerships with Rolls-Royce, Mitsubishi Heavy Industries, and Siemens have stretched back more than 50 years. More recently the Whittle Laboratory has partnered with Dyson, Reaction Engines, and Lilium.

The New Whittle Laboratory 
By radically changing both the culture and tools used in technology development, the New Whittle Laboratory  is aimed to dramatically cut the time required to achieve net zero flight. Recent pioneering trials at the Whittle Laboratory in collaboration with Rolls-Royce, and funded by the Aerospace Technology Institute, has demonstrated the ability to reduce the time require to design, build and test technologies by a factor of between 10 and 100, from years to months or weeks. This allow research teams to work in a hardware rich environment, failing fast to learn fast. The New Whittle Laboratory is designed to scale this process, acting as a zero carbon technology accelerator. It will act as a demonstrator of this game changing technology development process, allowing it to be replicated to other sectors and around the world.  https://www.re-tv.org/reinvigorate/reworking-innovation

International Awards
The Whittle Laboratory's work has won over 100 international awards including the Gas Turbine Award, the American Society of Mechanical Engineers highest honour in the field, 15 times. The award has been made once a year since 1963.

References

1973 establishments in England
University and college laboratories in the United Kingdom